John Michael LeRoy (April 19, 1975 – June 25, 2001) was a Major League Baseball pitcher. He played one game with the Atlanta Braves on September 26, 1997, throwing two scoreless innings, giving up one hit and three walks while striking out three more and picking up the victory. On November 18, 1997 he was selected by the Tampa Bay Devil Rays in the expansion draft.

LeRoy died on June 25, 2001 in Sioux City, Iowa after suffering a heart attack and brain aneurysm. He went into a coma on June 22, and was taken off life support three days later after a CAT scan showed no further brain activity. He died at the age of 26.

References

External links

Atlanta Braves players
1975 births
2001 deaths
Baseball players from Washington (state)
Sportspeople from Bellevue, Washington
Major League Baseball pitchers
Gulf Coast Braves players
Macon Braves players
Durham Bulls players
Greenville Braves players
St. Petersburg Devil Rays players
Orlando Rays players
Chattanooga Lookouts players
New Jersey Jackals players
Sioux City Explorers players
Deaths from intracranial aneurysm